George Green may refer to:

Arts and entertainment
George Green (actor) (21st century), Canadian actor
George Green (businessman) (1861–1915), British cinema pioneer
George Green (songwriter) (1952–2011), American co-author of several John Mellencamp hits
George Dawes Green (born 1954), American novelist and founder of The Moth
G. F. Green (George Frederick Green, 1911–1977), British fiction writer
George Hamilton Green (1893–1970), American xylophonist, composer and cartoonist

Science and medicine
George Green (mathematician) (1793–1841), British mathematical physicist
George F. Green (dentist) (fl. 1863), American inventor of a pneumatic dental drill
George Gill Green (1842–1925), American patent medicine entrepreneur and Colonel in the American Civil War
George Kenneth Green (1911–1997), American accelerator physicist

Sports

Association football
George Green (footballer, born 1891) (1891–1958), English footballer (Southampton)
George Green (footballer, born 1901) (1901–1980), English international footballer (Sheffield United)
George Green (footballer, born 1912), Welsh international footballer
George Green (footballer, born 1914) (1914–1995), English footballer (Bradford Park Avenue, Huddersfield Town & Reading)
George Green (footballer, born 1996) (born 1996), English footballer (Everton, Tranmere)

Other sports
George Green (Australian rules footballer) (1882–1949), Australian rules footballer
George Green (baseball) (1884–?), American baseball player
George Green (cricketer) (1880–1940), English cricketer
George Green (jockey) (died 1904), American jockey
George Green (racing driver) (born 1927), American NASCAR driver
George Green (rugby league) (1883–1938), Australian rugby league player
George Dallas Green (1934–2017), American baseball player

Others
George Green (chaplain) (1881–1956), Anglican clergyman in Central Queensland, Australia
George Green (land agent)  (c. 1820–1895), founder of Green's Exchange, father of George Dutton Green
George Green (Medal of Honor) (1840–1898), English-born Medal of Honor recipient in the American Civil War
George Green (murderer) (1900–1939), convicted of a double murder in Glenroy, Australia
George Green (politician) (active 1973–1997), Northern Irish unionist
George Green (shipbuilder) (1767–1849), English shipbuilder
George Green (trade unionist) (1908–1989), British trade union leader
George Dutton Green (1850–1900), Australian land agent, auctioneer, and politician
George E. Green (1858–1917), American businessman and politician from New York

Other uses
George Green, Buckinghamshire, English hamlet
George Green's School, Tower Hamlets, London, England
George Green (ship), page for ships with this name
George Green, a park in Wanstead, London, England

See also
George F. Green (disambiguation)
George Greene (disambiguation)